Digest of Middle East Studies is a biannual peer-reviewed academic journal published by Wiley-Blackwell on behalf of the Policy Studies Organization.  The journal was established in 1992 with Mohammed M. Aman (University of Wisconsin–Milwaukee) as editor-in-chief. The journal focuses on Middle Eastern studies, particularly regarding religion and politics.

References

External links 
 

Wiley-Blackwell academic journals
English-language journals
Publications established in 1992
Political science journals